Sodium bismuth titanate or bismuth sodium titanium oxide (NBT or BNT) is a solid inorganic compound of sodium, bismuth, titanium and oxygen with the chemical formula of Na0.5Bi0.5TiO3 or Bi0.5Na0.5TiO3. This compound adopts the perovskite structure.

Synthesis
Na0.5Bi0.5TiO3 is not a naturally occurring mineral and several synthesis routes to obtain the compound have been developed. It can be easily prepared by solid state reaction between Na2CO3, Bi2O3 and TiO2 at temperatures around 850 °C.

Structure

The exact room-temperature crystal structure of sodium bismuth titanate has been a matter of debate for several years. Early studies in the 1960s using X-ray diffraction suggested Na0.5Bi0.5TiO3 to adopt either a pseudo-cubic or a rhombohedral crystal structure. In 2010, based on the high-resolution single-crystal X-ray diffraction data, a monoclinic structure (space group Cc) was proposed. On heating, Na0.5Bi0.5TiO3 transforms at 533 ± 5 K to a tetragonal structure (space group P4bm) and above 793 ± 5 K to cubic structure (space group Pmm).

Physical properties
Na0.5Bi0.5TiO3 is a relaxor ferroelectric. Its optical band gap was reported to be in the 3.0–3.5 eV.

Applications

Various solid solutions with tetragonal ferroelectric perovskites including BaTiO3, Bi0.5K0.5TiO3  have been developed to obtain morphotropic phase boundaries to enhance the piezoelectric properties of Na0.5Bi0.5TiO3. The extraordinarily large strain generated by a field-induced phase transition in sodium bismuth titanate-based solid solutions prompted researchers to investigate its potential as an alternative to lead zirconate titanate for actuator applications.

References

Further reading
 Lead-Free Piezoelectrics, Ed. Shashank Priya and Sahn Nahm,(2012), Springer-Verlag, New York. .

Titanates
Bismuth compounds
Ceramic materials
Piezoelectric materials
Ferroelectric materials
Perovskites
Sodium compounds